is an aquarium on the island of Itsukushima in Hatsukaichi, Hiroshima, Japan.

Overview
There are about 350 variety of aquatic animals include finless porpoises, sea otters, Steller sea lions, sea lions  and penguins. Hours are from January 1 to December 25, 9:00 a.m. to 5:00 p.m.

History

Opened as a prefectural aquarium in 1959
Transferred to Miyajima, Hiroshima as a town aquarium in 1967
Reconstructed the buildings in 1981
Began to keep sea otters in 1985
Transferred to Hatsukaichi, Hiroshima as a city aquarium in 2005
Planned renewal in 2011

See also
Japanese Association of Zoos and Aquariums
Itsukushima

External links
Miyajima Public Aquarium
Japanese Association of Zoos and Aquariums

Tourist attractions in Hiroshima Prefecture
Aquaria in Japan
1959 establishments in Japan
Buildings and structures in Hiroshima Prefecture
Zoos established in 1959
Hatsukaichi, Hiroshima